Sammy Pharr Reese (September 11, 1930 – September 11, 1985 or September 12, 1985 (sources differ) ) was an American film and television actor. He was known for playing the role of the "Clerk" in the 1967 film In the Heat of the Night.

Reese was born in Montgomery, Alabama, the son of Mary Reese. He guest-starred in television programs, including The Andy Griffith Show, Gunsmoke, I Spy, The Big Valley, Iron Horse, Death Valley Days and That Girl. He also appeared in a few episodes of The Alfred Hitchcock Hour and Dr. Kildare, playing the role of "Dr. Dan Shanks", but only appeared in the first season on four episodes. He died on September 11, 1985 or September 12, 1985 (sources differ), at his 55th birthday of a stroke in Montgomery, Alabama.

Filmography

Film

Television

References

External links 

Rotten Tomatoes profile

1930 births
1985 deaths
Male actors from Montgomery, Alabama
American male film actors
American male television actors
20th-century American male actors